Raat Gayi, Baat Gayi? (Similar Proverb transl. 'Don't cry over spilt milk') is a 2009 Bollywood film written and directed by Saurabh Shukla. The film features Rajat Kapoor, Vinay Pathak, Neha Dhupia, Iravati Harshe and Anu Menon in leading roles.

Plot
Raat Gayi, Baat Gayi? is a film about three couples and a keen observation on modern day marriage. Rahul (Rajat Kapoor) wakes up with a bad hangover after a party the night before. There he had met a sexy young woman - Sophia (Neha Dhupia). They got drunk and there were sparks flying. But Rahul doesn't remember what happened after that. Did they go all the way? His wife, Mitali (Iravati Harshe), is in a particularly bad mood this morning, and Rahul suspects that she might know about his little escapade last night. Rahul starts chasing his night—trying to retrieve it—trying to find out what really happened. His friends Saxena (Dalip Tahil) and Amit (Vinay Pathak) are going through their own marital crises of sorts. Driven to his wit's end, he realizes he must seek Sophia out to restore his sanity

Cast
 Rajat Kapoor as Rahul Kapoor
 Vinay Pathak as Amit
 Dalip Tahil	as Jaswinder 'Jas' Saxena
 Iravati Harshe as Mitali R. Kapoor (credited as Irawati Harshe Mayadev)
 Anu Menon as Nandini 'Nandi'
 Navneet Nishan as Jolly J. Saxena (credited as Navniit Nisshan)
 Ranvir Shorey as Gagandeep 'Gags' Singh
 Aamir Bashir as Prasad
 Makrand Deshpande as Party Guest (credited as Makarand Deshpande)
 Sudhir Mishra as Archana's dad
 Neha Dhupia as Archana / Sophia
 Anil Chaudhary
 Masoom Gandhi as Komal 'Chutka' R. Kapoor
 Brijendra Kala (credited as Kala Briendra)
 Shikha Markana
 Tarini Mishra	
 Vivek Vaswani as Dr. Patkar

Soundtrack
The music of the film is composed by Ankur Tiwari. It consisted of 7 songs and 3 remixes. The music was released on T-Series. Lyrics were penned by Ankur Tiwari.

Track listing

Reception
The movie opened to mixed to negative reviews from critics. Taran Adarsh of Bollywood Hungama rated the film with one and half stars out of five saying, "In a nutshell, RAAT GAYI, BAAT GAYI? offers a few laughs, not laughter unlimited!"

Rajeev Masand of CNN-IBN gave the film two stars out of five and stated, "Raat Gayi Baat Gayi has the ingredients for a movie one would probably enjoy very much, but somehow they never come together."

Anupama Chopra of NDTV gave two and a half stars and commented, "This could have been a fun take on urban marriage but the script, by Rajat Kapoor and Saurabh Shukla, is absolute lead."

Nikhat Kazmi of the Times of India'' awarded three stars saying, "the film does augur for interesting viewing, providing an opportunity for a roll call of the entire current art house ensemble cast."

Awards and nominations

2009 New York South Asian International Film Festival
Won 
 Best Film - Saurabh Shukla and Rajat Kapoor

2010 Star Screen Awards
Nominated 
 Best Supporting Actress - Neha Dhupia
 Best Comedian - Vinay Pathak

References

External links
Official website

2009 films
2000s Hindi-language films